Beta Corvi or β Corvi, officially named Kraz, is the second-brightest star in the southern constellation of Corvus with an apparent visual magnitude of 2.647. Based on parallax measurements obtained during the Hipparcos mission, it is about  distant from the Sun.

Nomenclature 

β Corvi (Latinised to Beta Corvi) is the star's Bayer designation.

In a 1951 publication, Atlas Coeli (Skalnate Pleso Atlas of the Heavens) by Czech astronomer Antonín Bečvář, it bore the name Kraz, whose origin and meaning remain unknown. In 2016, the IAU organized a Working Group on Star Names (WGSN) to catalog and standardize proper names for stars. The WGSN approved the name Kraz for this star on 1 June 2018 and it is now so included in the List of IAU-approved Star Names.

Properties

Beta Corvi has about 3.7 times the Sun's mass and is roughly 206 million years old, which is old enough for a star of this mass to consume the hydrogen at its core and evolve away from the main sequence. The stellar classification is G5 II, with the luminosity class of 'II' indicating this is a bright giant. The effective temperature of the star's outer envelope is about 5,100 K, which produces a yellow hue common to G-type stars.

Because of the star's mass and radius, it is emitting about 164 times the luminosity of the Sun. The abundance of elements other than hydrogen or helium, what astronomers term metallicity, is similar to the proportions in the Sun.

This is a variable star that ranges in apparent visual magnitude from a low of 2.66 to a high of 2.60.

See also 
 A Carinae
 55 Cancri

References

G-type bright giants
Corvus (constellation)
Corvi, Beta
BD-22 3401
Corvi, 9
109379
061359
4786
Kraz